Martin Møller (born May 18, 1980 in Næstved, Denmark) is a Danish cross-country skier from Greenland. He competed for Denmark at the 2014 Winter Olympics in the cross-country skiing events. He is a past winner of Greenland's Arctic Circle Race.

References

External links
 
 
 
 

1980 births
Living people
Cross-country skiers at the 2014 Winter Olympics
Cross-country skiers at the 2018 Winter Olympics
Olympic cross-country skiers of Denmark
Danish male cross-country skiers
Tour de Ski skiers
Greenlandic sportspeople
Greenlandic sportsmen
People from Næstved Municipality
Sportspeople from Region Zealand
21st-century Danish people